Doomlord was a comic strip (and the shared title name of the central characters) published in the British comic book Eagle during the 1980s, from issue 1 on 27 March 1982 until issue 395 on 14 October 1989. Reprints of previous Doomlord stories continued until 7 April 1990. It was written by Alan Grant and John Wagner.

Initially an attempt in publishing science fiction horror in fumetti form (photo strip), Doomlord was later drawn by Heinzl (1983–1984) and Eric Bradbury (1984–1989). It was a saga beginning with an alien judging humanity's right to exist, and failing in his attempt to execute humanity. A replacement Doomlord ruled in favour of Earth and eventually became its protector, fathering a son; the strip evolved into superheroics.

Original photo strip

The strip originally appeared as a 13-part story in the first 13 issues of the re-launched Eagle, and was science horror in tone. Like many of the strips then published in Eagle, it was made up of black-and-white photographs featuring models and actors, with text boxes and speech and thought balloons.

The story tells of how journalist Howard Harvey and a policeman friend, Bob Murton, witnessed an apparent meteor falling into local woods. The meteor was in fact a spaceship bringing a sinister robed alien to Earth. He described himself as "Doomlord – servant of Nox, master of life, bringer of death!" Doomlord then killed Bob by seemingly merely grasping the policeman's head in his hands. He then knocked Harvey unconscious, who awoke to find himself alone. At the local police station, he discovered Bob alive, laughing at his friend's 'dream' – however, Bob was wearing the alien's "energiser ring". 'Bob' arranged a meeting with a local Member of Parliament and then disappeared.

Over the next few issues, Harvey pieced together what was happening – Doomlord had the power to murder people, and absorb their memories and personality by touch. He would then disintegrate their corpse with his energiser ring, and then use another alien ability – to shapeshift his form to resemble his absorbed victim, and thus impersonate them flawlessly. In this way, he could move freely amongst human society, leaving only a trail of missing persons as he abandoned each identity for a new one.

Harvey futilely attempted to stop Doomlord, but was unable to convince anyone else of the alien's existence. Doomlord also seemed invulnerable to harm. However, this did not extend to his human form and Harvey took advantage to shoot him with a gun.

But Doomlord exhibited a third alien ability – to pass his "life force" to another person, and then parasitically grow inside and eventually "take over" as if he had absorbed them.

Doomlord manipulated Harvey into a trap, and explained his "dread mission" as a "Servant of Nox" – he was to be sole judge, jury, and executioner on humanity's right to exist, using the identities of prominent businessmen, politicians, scientists, and other members of society's "elite" as stepping stones to gather evidence. If Doomlord judged humanity as unfit of stewardship of Earth, or to pose a potential risk to the larger interstellar community, he would destroy it – the billions of innocent human deaths being inconsequential, as "The fate of the individual is unimportant when the survival of the species is at stake." He viewed Harvey's attempts to stop him as an amusement, this was the only reason he did not kill him.

Doomlord was thus established as an extremely ruthless, even fascistic, "space vigilante" who would think nothing of genocide as long as the ends justified the means. As Alan Grant put it:

Doomlord delivered a verdict of guilty, and pronounced sentence of death upon humanity. He hypnotised Harvey to accompany him to a germ warfare establishment, to watch helplessly as Doomlord constructed a virus to kill humans worldwide, but leave other species unaffected. However, Harvey managed to overcome his hypnotism through strength of will, and stabbed Doomlord in human form. Doomlord infected Harvey with his life-force, so that Doomlord would once again re-incarnate and complete his dread mission. But Harvey sacrificed himself by releasing the virus within the sealed laboratory. Harvey's last act was to inform the dead Doomlord that humanity had the right to decide its own fate, no matter the consequences.

From Issue 2, the strip's masthead would depict Doomlord's latest victim transforming into the alien. Like many of the early Eagle strips, the original strip appeared in photographic fumetti format, requiring an actor in a custom-made rubber mask and hands and low-budget special effects. Despite this, the strip succeeded in producing atmosphere and dealt with adult issues such as environmentalism.

Second photo strip
The Doomlord strip was a "breakout" strip that was extremely popular, even more so than Dan Dare who was Eagle's main attraction. The strip returned in Eagle issue 21, titled Doomlord II, and was considerably more science fiction in approach. It revealed that "Doomlord" was a generic name for one of many "Servitors" from the planet of Nox, who had taken upon themselves the dread task of species-level eugenics for the common welfare of the galaxy. The rulers of Nox, the Dread Council, had noticed the disappearance of the first Doomlord (or Servitor Zyn) on Earth, and dispatched the novice Servitor Vek to investigate and possibly carry out Zyn's judgement. (Vek's name was however not revealed until the Doomlord III story, the Dread Council mentioning it when sending Servitor Zom to find the supposedly missing Vek.) The second series and subsequent series' were relayed mainly from the alien's point of view whereas the first series had been mainly from the point of view of Howard Harvey.

Vek's experiences of humanity were different from Zyn's. Taking the identity of commercial traveller Eric Plumrose, Vek lodged at Mrs Souster's bed and breakfast in Bradford, keeping her and her two young sons under permanent hypnosis, so that he could remain in his own identity, as being in other forms sapped his strength. Meanwhile, he determined Zyn's fate and recovered Zyn's energiser ring. Without someone like Harvey to harry him, he concluded – in contrast to Zyn's absolutist judgement – that humanity's problems were mostly social rather than inherent; humanity's leaders deserved the focus of blame, with the vast majority guilty of only apathy, ignorance and powerlessness. Vek petitioned the Council for a review of Zyn's judgement, who gave him one year to secretly influence humanity for the better, with execution to be carried out if he did not succeed.

The strip therefore shifted in tone to that of Vek trying to clandestinely alter human affairs to make them pass the Servitor's judgement, and became more political in line with Alan Grant's personal views. Over a several-month story arc, Vek hypnotised the wealthy to place hundreds of millions of pounds of funds in an environmental pressure group called Alternative Earth; increased political activity amongst the general public; and shocked the world into nuclear disarmament by manipulating the American military into launching a nuclear strike. One memorable sequence involved Vek assuming the identity of the chauffeur of a multinational industrialist prior to a television interview about industrial waste; hypnotised into saying 'only the truth', the industrialist not only agreed with the interviewer's charge of wanton pollution, but also reeled off a long list of unethical actions by his company. After the broadcast ended, the industrialist realized that his career and his company were ruined and committed suicide by drinking a poisonous effluent produced by his own company.
Being forced to "hurry things up", Vek launched a US nuclear missile on Russia. The Russians were able to destroy it safely and the near-miss shocked the superpowers into total nuclear disarmament. This was "mission accomplished" for Vek. The Dread Council of Nox lifted humanity's death sentence and asked him to return to Nox. However the explosion of the missile had destroyed his ship and he was forced to remain on Earth until a replacement craft could be sent. (In the Deathlords story the power of teleportation was revealed to the reader so it is unclear why they could not bring Vek home in this way). The Doomlord II series ended with Vek returning to Mrs Souster's boarding house to await his rescue.

Third photo strip
"Doomlord III", beginning in issue 49, began by showing these improvements were seen to be temporary. For example, an Arab state launched a nuclear missile, escalating a small-scale conflict and causing the world's powers to re-arm, and Alternative Earth's funds were embezzled by its director. Vek realised that human nature may have been a larger factor than he realised. The Dread Council, having lost faith in humanity's ability to keep its promises, ordered Vek to carry out the death sentence on humanity. Due to the fondness of mankind that he had developed, Vek disobeyed, revealing his existence to Humankind and taking an open stance in his attempts to manipulate humanity, pointing out the sentence of death hanging over it if it did not reform.

Doomlord set himself up as an "open figure" and granted audiences with anyone who requested one, to best influence humanity. A powerful theme in this phase of the strip is Vek's inherent passive behaviour in the face of bungled attempts at assassination, coercion, and propaganda by the British Government, combined with his simple message of cosmic judgement – "mature as a species, or I (or another Doomlord, if you kill me) will euthanise you to protect the other life on Earth". At times, he was almost portrayed as a Gandhi-like figure – albeit one who would disintegrate timewasters. As a demonstration of his power he even created a virus to destroy a small town, Prattlewell. Eventually, Vek was tranquillised whilst in human form, and was kept imprisoned underground, where, as he required ultraviolet light for sustenance, he starved to death and his corpse was triumphantly paraded as a trophy. However, he had transferred his life-force to a sympathetic scientist named Denby, and upon becoming Vek once more, lost patience with humanity and decided to carry out the death sentence. However, before he could do so, another servitor, Zom, arrived with the task of destroying both humanity and Vek. Vek accepted his fate but while Zom was on the way to create a man-destroying virus, humanity once more decided to abandon nuclear weapons and Vek was forced to kill Zom to save humanity. He explained to humanity what had happened and set himself up as humanity's protector, knowing that more Noxians would follow to slaughter humanity and that he was the only one who had a chance of defending them although his own life was now in danger for disobeying the Dread Council and, worse still, killing a fellow servitor. He then returned to Mrs Souster's boarding house once again. The third series ended in issue 67.

Ongoing drawn strip
Eagle was relaunched in issue 79, dated 24 September 1983, with all the photo-based strips either replaced or changed to drawn format. The strip, now called simply 'Doomlord', continued, and would run as a continuous saga until issue 395 in 1989. Initially pencilled by Gary Compton and inked by Heinzl (until August 1984), and later for a more extensive period pencilled and inked by Eric Bradbury, the strip was now unrestricted by budget or special effects constraints – the first page shows Vek warping into a bird and observing a road crash from aloft.

By this point, Vek's energiser ring had been revealed to have more abilities – it could also levitate him, project force fields, as well as other abilities as the script required. Vek had also been humanised to quite an extent – still staying at Mrs Souster's boarding house, he had almost become "one of the family" enjoying friendly banter with Mrs Souster and being a father-type figure to her sons Pete and Mike, however they were still hypnotised into seeing him as Eric Plumrose (Alan Grant described this "softer side" as "surreal" and "his Coronation Street-type soap opera existence").

The Dread Council became concerned at the lack of contact from Servitor Zom and contacted Vek to ask about Zom's whereabouts. Vek admitted he had killed Zom to protect the human race and that the judgement that humanity deserved to die was wrong. The Dread Council vowed that Vek would die for his crimes and they sent a trio of assassins, the Deathlords, to kill Vek. Their combined energiser rings proved too strong for his ring and it was destroyed and he was injured in the process but managed to escape in the form of a dog. However, as his condition worsened he was trapped in dog form, only managing to warp his head back to Noxian form. However, with the help of Mrs West and her son Nick, he was healed with a sunlamp. The Deathlords had set up a shield around Bradfield to stop Vek escaping and decided to use his love of humanity to lure him out. They sent hypnotic waves all over the town to force the people to walk into the shield which killed them. Vek went to the centre point of the shield and found the energiser ring which was producing it. A deathlord was waiting for him but Vek managed to reach the ring first by throwing bricks from a chimney at the deathlord, knocking him over and giving Vek enough time to use the ring to kill the deathlord and deactivate the shield. He then disappeared for a few months giving the deathlords no idea of how to find him (although there is no explanation as to why they couldn't track him through the energiser). 
However at a New Year party Vek was unable to maintain the human form he was in and the deathlords began the chase once again. This was the first time that teleportation was revealed as possible. The deathlords found him but Vek also managed to teleport and escape. Eventually they grew tired of the chase and decided to lure him out. They killed 104 humans on a motorway and then sent a message to Vek that the next day they would kill 10,000 if he did not surrender. Vek realised that if they continued they would eventually destroy humanityk by killing an ever increasing number of people, so he decided that he must face them. However he cleverly chose the battleground as Stonehenge. He was able to send an energy bolt ricochetting round the ancient stones which eventually struck a deathlord and killed him. The remaining deathlord attacked with an energiser beam that was stronger than the shield produced by Vek's energiser. Realising he was doomed unless he acted, Vek teleported to hide behind a stone and immediately sent another bolt through the stone which killed the last remaining deathlord. He kept the deathlord's ring as extra weaponry, fully aware that other assassins would be sent.

Vek appeared on global television and explained the Noxian ethical code and the Deathlords, pointing out that now he was all that stood between humanity and execution, and how he had rebelled against Nox to protect them. This marked a turning-point in human attitude towards Doomlord, despite the fact that he, himself, had killed many humans.

Shortly afterwards, Vek was taken to Nox by a fail-safe device in the Deathlords' ship when he tried to use it to rescue the Space Shuttle, where he convinced the Council that the death judgement was wrong and to lift the sentence of death from Earth; however his crimes against Nox meant he was returned to Earth in exile.

For the next few years, the strip changed emphasis from a continual science-fiction saga to several loosely connected superheroic adventures, including:
Repelling the Geminid Plague, genetically engineered parasitic insects used by the robotic Populators of Pollux to wipe out a planet's higher lifeforms in advance for use as a breeding ground; Vek destroyed both the Geminids and the Populators themselves
"The Doomlord Show", where he would kidnap various public figures, connect them to an electrified lie detector to reveal criminal or unethical behaviour, punish criminals with political connections who could avoid conventional justice, and even respond to phoned-in personal grievances, as he could teleport directly there and employ intimidation
The inadvertent revival of Doomlord Zyn through stored tissue samples from Howard Harvey, who resumed his attempts to execute humanity until Vek absorbed his life-force. 
The galactic carnival of Tibor, who captured Mrs. Souster's sons to lure Vek as an exhibit. The ending of this story led into another adventure in a parallel timeline, when Doomlord – having rescued Pete and Mike, and whilst taking them home – accidentally landed on an alternative Earth where his renegade son Enok (see below) had escaped his asteroid prison and enslaved the whole planet
Combating S.M.O.G., a terrorist organisation that had previously appeared in the Eagle strip Manix. Robot secret agent Manix himself is referred to at one point during this story, and also appears briefly – albeit only in flashback
Requiring a Noxian lodestone to recover from a serious illness after a passionate plea by Douglas Reeve on the nature of Noxian justice. The Sousters became aware at this point that they had Doomlord living under their roof although the hypnotic block remained, so they still "saw" Eric Plumrose.
Being manipulated into freeing the Noxian mystic Orak, by Lord Kev and Lady Shal
Becoming leader of the Dread Council to fight off an attack on Nox by the Reptilans
The building of an isolarium on the moon, recognition of the character's Superman overtones

Enok
A lengthy plot introduced the character of Enok. Vek decided to become a father to further his understanding of humans, particularly the emotion of love so used his bioengineering knowledge to artificially produce and rapidly grow a human-Noxian hybrid called Enok. Inevitably, Enok's human emotions and flaws led him to delinquency, eventually murdering Vek despite his fatherly love and protection from the Noxian Firelords who sought to kill Enok due to his 'impurity'. Enok then wreaked havoc on Earth that resembled adolescent frustration more than true evil. Douglas Reeve injected himself with a stored sample of Vek's blood, thus becoming Doomlord, and, unable to murder his own son, abandoned Enok on an asteroid.

Return to saga-based roots
Eventually, the strip returned to the original saga format. Many "holes" began to appear in the plot as this point, direct contradictions of what had gone before, and even for a work of fiction, some of the stories bordered on farcical. Vek had to undergo a psychological ordeal in the mystical Realms of Death to ensure his dedication to the Cold Blue Flame of Noxian justice. He was purged of his human emotions, became a Servitor once more, and returned with a burning hatred of humanity, charged with its execution, despite the fact that the Dread Council had lifted the death sentence.

Vek had previously brought Enok back to Earth, fearing the result of the ordeal, and had placed him in his final 'growth cycle' under a South American waterfall, correctly gambling that this would mature Enok and improve his disposition and foster a love of Earth. In effect, Vek and Enok had switched roles – Enok now protected Humanity, whilst Vek wished to destroy it. Vek had been given a new energiser ring which allowed him to both animate objects (such as getting a chimney to fight for him) and travel through time, resulting in him destroying the advanced prehistoric civilisation of Atlantis.

When Vek returned, he easily murdered Enok, the animated chimney pounding him to death so the Souster boys deliberately ate his blood as Vek tormented the Earth; the older brother, Pete, managed to return as Enok, and facing Vek in combat, their energisers interacted to render him permanently intangible, whereupon he retreated into hiding inside a mountain. Enok found himself continuing in Vek's role as Earth's now unwanted and resented protector, fighting a "pollution monster", alien mind parasites, and – in an admission the strip had now shed almost all of its science fiction aspects – a 'rival superhero' created by the siphoning off of part of his life-force. During the same period, the younger Souster boy, Mike, also became Enok, but with unexplained vampiric qualities.

The first Enok was killed fighting the rival superhero that had been possessed by the mind parasites, leaving the second Enok undecided as to whether to protect humanity or feast upon it, in an unexpectedly abrupt end to the strip.

Classic stories of Doomlord continued in reprint form until April 1990, but the strip was dropped completely for Eagle'''s last revamp.

Collections
 Doomlord: The Deathlords of Nox (2006), reprinting stories from The Eagle'' 24 September 1983 – 3 March 1984. Paperback, published by Hibernia, . Written by Alan Grant and John Wagner, illustrated by Heinzl.

References

External links
 Doomlord entry at 2000AD database
 Part of an interview with Alan Grant
 Entry on International Hero
 Review of the anthology "Doomlord – The Deathlords of Nox"
 Fustar.info interview with David McDonald, publisher of the reprinted anthology "Doomlord – The Deathlords of Nox"
 Hibernia, publishers of the reprinted volume

1982 comics debuts
Comics about extraterrestrial life
Comics by John Wagner
Eagle comic strips
Superhero comic strips